Ricardo L. Saludo is the former chairperson of the Philippine Civil Service Commission. Under his term as chairperson, the SSL-3 or the third Salary Standardization Law (SSL) was passed, resulting to a hike in monthly compensation of all government officials and employees.

He served the Philippine government, particularly the executive branch, in various capacities: head of the Presidential Management Staff, Cabinet Secretary, and Deputy Presidential Spokesperson to President Gloria Macapagal Arroyo.

Education
Saludo earned his Master of Science (MS) degree, major in public policy and management, from the University of London. He completed his undergraduate studies in 1977 at the Ateneo de Manila University with a bachelor's degree in literature, cum laude.

Outside government
Saludo worked as a senior business editor of AsiaWeek from 1989 to 1995. He later became a commentator of Asia Affairs for CNN and CNBC news networks in 1995 until 2001. He also worked as the assistant managing director of AsiaWeek magazine from 1996 to 2001. In 2002, he left the private sector to join the Arroyo administration.

Presently, he is the managing director, and co-founder along with fellow former presidential spokesperson Sec. Gary Olivar, of the Center for Strategy, Enterprise, and Intelligence, a management and media consultancy firm. He is also lecturer at the National College of Public Administration and Governance (NCPAG) of the University of the Philippines. He teaches the course The Administrator in the Philippine Public Service.

References

Living people
Chairpersons of constitutional commissions of the Philippines
Cabinet Secretaries of the Philippines
Heads of the Presidential Management Staff of the Philippines
Alumni of the University of London
Arroyo administration cabinet members
Year of birth missing (living people)